Chris Ciezki (born January 6, 1981 in Edmonton, Alberta) is a former professional Canadian football fullback for the Edmonton Eskimos of the Canadian Football League. In 2004 Ciezki was awarded the Wally Buono Award recognizing Canada's top junior football player. He was signed by the BC Lions as an undrafted free agent in 2007. He played CIS football for the UBC Thunderbirds.  Chris retired in April 2011.

References

1981 births
Living people
BC Lions players
Canadian football fullbacks
Edmonton Elks players
Players of Canadian football from Alberta
Canadian football people from Edmonton
UBC Thunderbirds football players